Chris Shelton could refer to:

 Chris Shelton (baseball)
 Chris Shelton (author)